Alexander Hansen may refer to:

 Alexander Betten Hansen (born 1996), Norwegian football defender 
 Alexander Lund Hansen (born 1982), Norwegian footballer

See also 
 Alexander Lindqvist-Hansen (born 1992), Swedish ice hockey player